Erling Broch (22 February 1875 – 4 September 1941) was a Norwegian judge.

He was born in Horten to brewery owner Johan Anthony Zincke Broch and Fanny Caroline Harriet Gamborg. He was a brother of Hjalmar Broch, Olaf Broch, Lagertha Broch and Nanna Broch, father of Lisbeth Broch, and father-in-law of Vilhelm Evang.

He graduated as cand.jur. in 1899, and was named as a Supreme Court Justice from 1924.

References

1875 births
1941 deaths
People from Horten
Supreme Court of Norway justices